Martin Pröll (born 21 March 1981, in Freistadt) is an Austrian track and field athlete who mainly competes in the 3000 metres steeplechase.

Achievements

References
 
 

1981 births
Living people
Austrian male middle-distance runners
Austrian male steeplechase runners
People from Freistadt District
Olympic athletes of Austria
Athletes (track and field) at the 2004 Summer Olympics
Sportspeople from Upper Austria